International Political Sociology (IPS) is an interdisciplinary field and set of approaches at the crossroads of international relations theory and other disciplines such as sociology, geography and anthropology. It is structured around initiatives such as the journal International Political Sociology and the network Doingips, as well as scholars such as Didier Bigo, Anastassia Tsoukala, Ayse Ceyhan or Elspeth Guild.

Security studies 
The IPS approach to security studies is often also referred to as Paris School of security studies within the discipline, and is closely associated with the journal Cultures et Conflits. According to Didier Bigo an IPS approach to security argues that both security and insecurity are the result of an (in)securitization process based on a speech act calling for a politics of exception and a general frame linked to the existence of transnational bureaucracies and private agents managing insecurity that compete to frame security issues. Bigo further argues that this (in)securitization process is embedded in the use of technology in every day practices. IPS approaches to security criticize of the characterization of security studies as a sub-discipline of international relations and the association of security with survival. IPS challenges the Copenhagen School's understanding of the securitization process arguing that securitization is not the result of a successful speech act but mundane bureaucratic decisions, use of technologies and Weberian routines of rationalization. The International Political Sociology approach to security is particularly influenced by a Foucaultian reading of policing as a form of governmentality, as well as insights from the work of Pierre Bourdieu.

The "sociology of security" is the scientific study of the relationships between community and security. It addresses the questions what understanding of security does society create and conversely, what society does security establish. In other words, sociology of security is the study of mutual interactions between security and the society that result in developing or production and reproduction of security in the society.

The answer to the question "what is the Sociology of Security?" can be discussed from two viewpoints. The first says that the Sociology of Security addresses the "understanding of security", so it asks:

 What kind of understanding of security does the society provide? 
 Based on what elements does society formulate the security? 
 How does society organize the stable and fragile society? 
 How much does the society want to institutionalize the security? 
 How do distinctions and differences between security and insecurity form and reproduce in society? 

On the other hand, because the aim of Sociology of Security is to study mutual interaction between society and security, the second viewpoint asks:

 What kind of society does the security form? 
 What are the benefits and barriers of security for the society? 
 What type of interactions does security provide in different environments (urban / rural…) in various situations (parties / union...) in different groups (family / friends...)? 
 How does security use social forces such as classes of society? 
 What restrictions or barriers does security form for society?

See also
 Critical security studies

References

External links
Doingips website

Security studies
Paris School (security)
International relations theory
Methods in sociology